Siege of Grave may refer to:
 Siege of Grave (1586)
 Siege of Grave (1602)